Qarghiliq is a neighborhood in Kashgar, in the Xinjiang Uyghur Autonomous Region of China.

Kashgar